The 1996 Clásica de San Sebastián was the 16th edition of the Clásica de San Sebastián cycle race and was held on 10 August 1996. The race started and finished in San Sebastián. The race was won by Udo Bölts of the Telekom team.

General classification

References

Clásica de San Sebastián
San
Clasica De San Sebastian
August 1996 sports events in Europe